Astrakhanovka is a village in the Jalilabad Rayon of Azerbaijan.

References
 

Populated places in Jalilabad District (Azerbaijan)